Mary Knight Wood Mason (17 April 1857 – 20 December 1944) was an American pianist, music educator and composer. She was born in Easthampton, Massachusetts, the daughter of Lieutenant-governor, manufacturer and philanthropist Horatio G. Knight and Mary Ann Huntoon Knight. She was educated at Charlier Institute in New York City and Miss Porter's School in Farmington, Connecticut, studying music with Karl Klauser, Benjamin Johnson Lang and Henry Holden Huss.

Knight married Charles Greenleaf Wood of Boston in 1879, and Alfred Bishop Mason of New York in 1914, after which she lived in New York City and summered at a cabin in the Catskill Mountains. She died in Florence, Italy.

Works
Wood published about fifty songs. Selected works include:
Afterward
Thou
Ashes of Roses (Words by Elaine Goodale)
Thy Name
Songs of Sleep

Her music has been recorded and issued on CD, including:
Women at an Exposition: Music Composed by Women and Performed at the 1893 World's Fair in Chicago Audio CD (July 27, 1993)  Koch Int'l Classics, ASIN: B000001SH8

References

External links
 
 Sheet music for "Afterward", Oliver Ditson Company, 1896.

1857 births
1944 deaths
19th-century classical composers
19th-century American composers
19th-century women composers
20th-century classical composers
20th-century American composers
20th-century women composers
20th-century American women musicians
American classical composers
American women classical composers
Classical musicians from Massachusetts
Miss Porter's School alumni
People from Easthampton, Massachusetts
19th-century American women musicians